Elkins may refer to:

Places in the United States 
 Elkins, Arkansas
 Elkins, New Hampshire
 Elkins, West Virginia
 Elkins Park, Pennsylvania

Similar names
Elkin, North Carolina

Other places 
 Mount Elkins, East Antarctica

Other uses 
 Elkins (surname)
 Elkins Automatic Rifle

See also